The Melbourne Rising is an Australian rugby union team based in Melbourne that competes in the National Rugby Championship (NRC). The team represents the rugby community in Victoria and is organised and managed by Rugby Victoria with the coaching and training programs used by the Melbourne Rebels being extended to players joining the team from the Rebels, the local Dewar Shield competition, and local Victorian juniors.

The NRC was launched in 2014, reinstating the national competition after an absence of six years. The previous competition was the Australian Rugby Championship (ARC), which was discontinued in 2007 after only one season. The team representing Victoria in the ARC was the Melbourne Rebels, organised and managed by the VRU. That Rebels team was the predecessor of the Melbourne Rebels team in Super Rugby and the Melbourne Rising team in the NRC.

Colours and logo
As of 2016, Melbourne Rising's colours of red, white and blue are those of the Melbourne Rebels, although the side previously played in a navy blue and pink jersey, with white and electric blue highlights. The team's current logo is also adapted from that of the parent franchise, with the name Melbourne Rising used instead of Melbourne Rebels.

History
In 2004, a consortium led by the Victorian Rugby Union entered the bidding process for a licence in the Super 14 competition to get a team in Melbourne for the 2006 season. The then Super 12 competition was expanding to 14 teams, with one new licence being allocated to an Australian team and another to a South African team. Victoria and Western Australia were the leading bidders for the Australian team and the licence was eventually allocated to Western Australia, creating the Western Force.

For the Australian Rugby Championship in 2007, however, both Victoria and Western Australia were allocated teams. The Australian Rugby Union announced the new, eight-team national competition after setting up a consultative process in 2006 which culminated in a working session of some 70 delegates from around the country. It was reported that New South Wales gave up a fourth team to enable Victoria to participate in the new national competition.

Melbourne Rebels (ARC team)

The Melbourne Rebels team was formed to participate in the Australian Rugby Championship (ARC) that started in August 2007. It was the only team in the ARC that was not directly linked to a Super Rugby franchise as Victoria did not have one at the time.

The Rebels' jersey had traditional navy blue and white hoops, the colours of the Victorian Axemen side that represented Victoria in the Australian Rugby Shield. The Rebels name was chosen in consultation with the local rugby community. VRU officials decided on the name in reference to Victoria's first Wallaby, Sir Edward "Weary" Dunlop. At the official launch of the team's name and jersey on 29 March 2007, former Wallaby Chris “Buddha” Handy said:

The Rebels' head coach for the ARC was Bill Millard, a former coach of the Australian Sevens and Sydney University. Former Wallaby Fletcher Dyson was a coaching consultant. Former Rugby World Cup-winning coach Rod Macqueen was the No. 1 ticket holder and a passionate supporter of the club. The Melbourne side was allowed to sign a number of players from the four Australian Super 14 franchises. This included three players from the Brumbies and Western Force, and one each from the New South Wales Waratahs and Queensland Reds. David Croft was the 2007 captain.

The Melbourne Rebels played their ARC home games at the Olympic Park Stadium located in inner Melbourne, but the team's first league game was an away win against the Canberra team in round one. The Melbourne Rebels played their first home match in front of 4,875 people at Olympic Park the following week, beating the East Coast Aces.

After finishing fourth on the league table, the Rebels defeated the minor premiers Western Sydney in their semi-final 23 to 3. The Rebels played the Central Coast Rays in the inaugural ARC Grand Final. The Melbourne team was defeated by the Central Coast 20 points to 12 in the Grand Final, finishing runners-up in the competition.

The Australian Rugby Championship was terminated at the end of 2007 after only one season of competition, with the Australian Rugby Union citing higher costs than budgeted and further projected financial losses. The Melbourne Rebels side was disbanded with the end of the ARC, but was revived in 2010 under the same name as the Super 14 tournament was expanded to the 15-team Super Rugby competition to include the Melbourne Rebels for the 2011 season.

National Rugby Championship
In December 2013, the ARU announced that the national competition was to be relaunched, with the National Rugby Championship (NRC) commencing in 2014. Expressions of interest were open to any interested bidders, with the accepted tenders finalised in early 2014. On 24 March 2014, it was announced that the Melbourne Rising would play in the NRC competition.

The Rising's jersey for the 2014 season was predominantly navy blue and pink, with white and electric blue highlights. The team's logo incorporated a rising star, representing future talent; a floral arrangement of Pink Heath, which is the state flower of Victoria; and the five stars representing the Melbourne Rebels.

For the 2014 NRC season, the Melbourne Rising secured RaboDirect as the main jersey sponsor. Sean Hedger and Matt Cockbain were appointed as head coach and forwards coach of the Rising. Both were assistant coaches at the Rebels. Craig McGrath, coach of the Melbourne Harlequin club, was appointed as backs coach. The Rising's training base is also at the Harlequin club in Ashwood. Nic Stirzaker was named as captain with Mitch Inman, Patrick Leafa and Pom Simona in the team's leadership group. Scrumhalf Luke Burgess played for both the Melbourne Rebels ARC team in 2007 and the Melbourne Rising NRC team in 2014.

Home grounds
The Melbourne Rising team has scheduled home matches at the following locations for the 2019 season:

Other home venues used in previous seasons:

For the Rising's initial season, the team played at AAMI Park, located in inner Melbourne. Opened in 2010, the stadium's major tenants include the Melbourne Rebels, Melbourne Storm, Melbourne Victory and Melbourne City FC. Smaller venues were preferred from 2016 onward.

Current squad
The squad for the 2019 NRC season:
</onlyinclude>

</onlyinclude>

Records

Honours
National Rugby Championship
Playoff appearances: 2014, 2015, 2016
Horan-Little Shield
Season winners: 2014
Australian Rugby Championship (Rebels)
Runners-up: 2007

Season standings
National Rugby Championship
{| class="wikitable" style="text-align:center;"
|- border=1 cellpadding=5 cellspacing=0
! style="width:20px;"|Year
! style="width:20px;"|Pos
! style="width:20px;"|Pld
! style="width:20px;"|W
! style="width:20px;"|D
! style="width:20px;"|L
! style="width:20px;"|F
! style="width:20px;"|A
! style="width:25px;"|+/-
! style="width:20px;"|BP
! style="width:20px;"|Pts
! style="width:25em; text-align:left;"|  Play-offs
|-
|2019
|7th
| 7 || 2 || 0 || 5 || 206 || 211 || –5 || 3 || 11
|align=left|  Did not compete
|-
|2018
|6th
| 7 || 2 || 0 || 5 || 239 || 192 || +47 || 5 || 13
|align=left|  Did not compete
|-
|2017
|9th
| 8 || 1 || 0 || 7 || 193 || 357 ||–164 || 0 || 4
|align=left|  Did not compete
|-
|2016
|4th
| 7 || 3 || 0 || 4 || 260 || 262 ||  −2 || 4 || 16
|align=left|  Semi-final loss to NSW Country by 50–24
|-
|2015
|3rd
| 8 || 5 || 0 || 3 || 220 || 251 || −31 || 0 || 20
|align=left|  Semi-final loss to UC Vikings by 50–34.
|-
|2014
|1st
| 8 || 8 || 0 || 0 || 399 || 184 || +215 || 8 || 40
|align=left|  Semi-final loss to Perth Spirit by 29–45.
|}

Australian Rugby Championship (Rebels)
{| class="wikitable" style="text-align:center;"
|- border=1 cellpadding=5 cellspacing=0
! style="width:20px;"|Year
! style="width:20px;"|Pos
! style="width:20px;"|Pld
! style="width:20px;"|W
! style="width:20px;"|D
! style="width:20px;"|L
! style="width:20px;"|F
! style="width:20px;"|A
! style="width:25px;"|+/-
! style="width:20px;"|BP
! style="width:20px;"|Pts
! style="width:25em; text-align:left;"|  Play-offs
|-
|2007
|4th
| 8 || 5 || 0 || 3 || 170 || 206 || -36 || 4 || 24
|align=left|  Runners-up
|}

Head coaches
 Pom Simona (2019–present)
 Eoin Toolan (2018)
 Zane Hilton (2015–2017)
 Sean Hedger (2014)
 Bill Millard (2007) – Rebels ARC

Captains
 Semisi Tupou (2019–present)
 Angus Cottrell (2018)
 Steve Cummins (2017)
 Nic Stirzaker (2016)
 Colby Fainga'a and Scott Fuglistaller (2015)
 Nic Stirzaker (2014)
 David Croft (2007) – Rebels ARC

Squads
{| class="collapsible collapsed" style=" width: 100%; margin: 0px; border: 1px solid darkgray; border-spacing: 3px;"
|-
! colspan="10" style="background-color:#f2f2f2; cell-border:2px solid black; padding-left: 1em; padding-right: 1em; text-align: center;" |2019 Melbourne Rising squad – NRC
|-
|colspan="10"|The squad for the 2019 National Rugby Championship season:

|-
| width="3%"| 
| width="30%" style="font-size: 95%;" valign="top"|

Props
 Jermaine Ainsley
 Angus Arundel
 Pone Fa'amausili
 Tetera Faulkner
 Matt Gibbon
 Noa Noa
 Fereti Sa'aga
 Junior Uelese

Hookers
 Anaru Rangi
 JP Sauni
 Moli Sooaemalelagi
 Mahe Vailanu

Locks
 Will Clift
 Esei Ha'angana
 Trevor Hosea
 Matt Philip

| width="3%"| 
| width="30%" style="font-size: 95%;" valign="top"|

Loose Forwards
 Angus Cottrell
 Richard Hardwick
 Ross Haylett-Petty
 Luke Jones
 Boyd Killingworth
 Rob Leota
 Pat Morrey
 Maciu Nabolakasi
 George Noa
 Katinali Tai
 Joseva Tamani
 Ola Tauelangi
 Ikapote Tupai

Scrum-halves
 Reece Fuller
 Delai Moto
 Theo Strang

Fly-halves
 Navarre Haisila
 Michael Moloney
 James So'oialo

| width="3%"| 
| width="30%" style="font-size: 95%;" valign="top"|

Centres
 Rodney Iona
 Lloyd Johansson
 William Lewesi
 Harry Potter

Wingers
 Taylor Acheson
 Lolohea Loco
 Matai Nairavu
 Ah-mu Tuimalealiifano
 Semisi Tupou (c)
 Nailati Ukalele

Fullbacks
 Isaiah Leota
 Jack Maddocks1
 Justin Marsters

(c) Denotes team captain, Bold denotes player is internationally capped, 1 denotes allocated national player additional to the contracted squad.
|}

{| class="collapsible collapsed" style=" width: 100%; margin: 0px; border: 1px solid darkgray; border-spacing: 3px;"
|-
! colspan="10" style="background-color:#f2f2f2; cell-border:2px solid black; padding-left: 1em; padding-right: 1em; text-align: center;" |2018 Melbourne Rising squad – NRC
|-
|colspan="10"|The squad for the 2018 National Rugby Championship season:

|-
| width="3%"| 
| width="30%" style="font-size: 95%;" valign="top"|

Props
 Jermaine Ainsley1
 Mees Erasmus
 Pone Fa'amausili
 Tom Moloney
 Fereti Sa'aga
 Laurie Weeks

Hookers
 Feta Luamanu
 Anaru Rangi
 Andrew Tuala

Locks
 Will Clift
 Esei Ha'angana
 Trevor Hosea
 Sakaria Noa
 Matt Philip

| width="3%"| 
| width="30%" style="font-size: 95%;" valign="top"|

Loose Forwards
 Angus Cottrell (c)
 Richard Hardwick
 Rob Leota
 Isi Naisarani
 George Noa
 Ikapote Tupai
 Kojiro Yoshida

Scrum-halves
 Harrison Goddard
 Michael Ruru

Fly-halves
 Archie King
 Jack Maddocks1

| width="3%"| 
| width="30%" style="font-size: 95%;" valign="top"|

Centres
 Fabian Goodall
 Angelo Leaupepe
 Bill Meakes
 Sione Tui
 Sione Tuipulotu

Wingers
 Tom English
 Justin Masters
 Sefa Naivalu1
 Kitione Ratu

Fullbacks
 Kemu Valetini

(c) Denotes team captain, Bold denotes player is internationally capped, 1 denotes allocated national player additional to the contracted squad.
|}

{| class="collapsible collapsed" style=" width: 100%; margin: 0px; border: 1px solid darkgray; border-spacing: 3px;"
|-
! colspan="10" style="background-color:#f2f2f2; cell-border:2px solid black; padding-left: 1em; padding-right: 1em; text-align: center;" |2017 Melbourne Rising squad – NRC
|-
|colspan="10"|The squad for the 2017 National Rugby Championship season:

|-
| width="3%"| 
| width="30%" style="font-size: 95%;" valign="top"|

Props
 Angus Arundel
 Tom Moloney
 Rory O’Connor
 Fereti Sa'aga
 Toby Smith1
 Mahe Vailanu

Hookers
 James Hanson
 Siliva Siliva
 Jordan Uelese

Locks
 Steve Cummins (c)
 Pone Fa’amuasili
 Esei Ha'angana
 Alex Toolis
 Emmanuel Maufou

| width="3%"| 
| width="30%" style="font-size: 95%;" valign="top"|

Loose Forwards
 Josh Fenner
 Simei Kolio
 Rob Leota
 Sean McMahon
 Sione Taufa
 Lopeti Timani1
 Ikapote Tupai

Scrum-halves
 Maradona Farao
 Harrison Goddard
 Nic Stirzaker

Fly-halves
 Jack McGregor

| width="3%"| 
| width="30%" style="font-size: 95%;" valign="top"|

Centres
 Lloyd Johansson
 Angelo Leaupepe
 Hunter Paisami
 Oliva Sialau
 Sione Tuipulotu
 Semisi Tupou

Wingers
 Henry Hutchison
 Marika Koroibete
 Sefa Naivalu1

Fullbacks
 Jack Maddocks
 Reece Hodge1
 Kitione Ratu

Notes:(c) Team captainBold denotes internationally capped players at the time1 National player additional to contracted squad.
|}

{| class="collapsible collapsed" style=" width: 100%; margin: 0px; border: 1px solid darkgray; border-spacing: 3px;"
|-
! colspan="10" style="background-color:#f2f2f2; cell-border:2px solid black; padding-left: 1em; padding-right: 1em; text-align: center;" |2016 Melbourne Rising squad – NRC
|-
|colspan="10"|The squad for the 2016 National Rugby Championship season:

|-
| width="3%"| 
| width="30%" style="font-size: 95%;" valign="top"|

Props
 Cruze Ah-Nau
 Tyrel Lomax
 Tim Metcher
 Tom Moloney
 Fereti Sa'aga
 Toby Smith1

Hookers
 James Hanson1
 Patrick Leafa
 Siliva Siliva
 Jordan Uelese

Locks
 Steve Cummins
 Murray Douglas
 Sam Jeffries
 Alex Toolis

| width="3%"| 
| width="30%" style="font-size: 95%;" valign="top"|

Loose Forwards
 Colby Fainga'a
 Harley Fox
 Ikapote Tupai
 Rob Leota
 Sean McMahon1
 Jordy Reid
 Sione Taufa

Scrum-halves
 Ben Meehan
 Michael Snowden
 Nic Stirzaker (c)

Fly-halves
 Jack Debreczeni

| width="3%"| 
| width="30%" style="font-size: 95%;" valign="top"|

Centres
 Lloyd Johansson
 Taiso Silafai-Leaana
 Sefa Naivalu
 Sione Tuipulotu
 Elias Vole

Wingers
 Tom English
 Dom Shipperley
 Ah-Mu Tuimaleali'ifano

Fullbacks
 Reece Hodge
 Jack Maddocks
 Jonah Placid

Notes:(c) Team captainBold denotes internationally capped players at the time1 National player additional to contracted squad.
|}

{| class="collapsible collapsed" style=" width: 100%; margin: 0px; border: 1px solid darkgray; border-spacing: 3px;"
|-
! colspan="10" style="background-color:#f2f2f2; cell-border:2px solid black; padding-left: 1em; padding-right: 1em; text-align: center;" |2015 Melbourne Rising squad – NRC
|-
|colspan="10"|The squad for the 2015 National Rugby Championship season:

|-
| width="3%"| 
| width="30%" style="font-size: 95%;" valign="top"|

Props
 Cruze Ah-Nau
 Duncan Chubb
 Tim Metcher
 Fereti Sa'aga
 Mike Tyler

Hookers
 Mitch Andrews
 Patrick Leafa

Locks
 Steve Cummins
 Murray Douglas
 Sam Jeffries
 Luke Jones1
 Sakaria Noa

| width="3%"| 
| width="30%" style="font-size: 95%;" valign="top"|

Loose Forwards
 Colby Fainga'a (c)
 Scott Fuglistaller (c)
 Sean McMahon1
 Jordy Reid
 Pom Simona
 Sione Taufa
 Lopeti Timani

Scrum-halves
 Maradona Farao
 Ben Meehan
 Junior Paila

Fly-halves
 Jack Debreczeni

| width="3%"| 
| width="30%" style="font-size: 95%;" valign="top"|

Centres
 Lloyd Johansson
 Taiso Silafai-Leaana
 Leo Taliu
 Sasa Tofilau
 Sione Tuipulotu

Wingers
 Tom English1
 Stacey Ili
 Filipe Vilitati
 Dom Shipperley

Fullbacks
 Justin Marsters
 Jonah Placid

Notes:(c) Team captainBold denotes internationally capped players at the time1 National player additional to contracted squad.
|}

{| class="collapsible collapsed" style=" width: 100%; margin: 0px; border: 1px solid darkgray; border-spacing: 3px;"
|-
! colspan="10" style="background-color:#f2f2f2; cell-border:2px solid black; padding-left: 1em; padding-right: 1em; text-align: center;" |2014 Melbourne Rising squad – NRC
|-
|colspan="10"|The squad for the 2014 National Rugby Championship season:

|-
| width="3%"| 
| width="30%" style="font-size: 95%;" valign="top"|

Props
 Cruze Ah-Nau
 Paul Alo-Emile
 Fereti Sa'aga
 Finbar Simpson
 Toby Smith
 Tui Tuiatua

Hookers
 Greg Bauer
 Patrick Leafa
 Tom Sexton

Locks
 Frank Amituanai
 Angus Hamilton
 Sam Jeffries
 Luke Jones1
 Cadeyrn Neville

| width="3%"| 
| width="30%" style="font-size: 95%;" valign="top"|

Loose Forwards
 Scott Higginbotham1
 Sean McMahon
 OJ Noa
 Reuben Rolleston
 Pom Simona
 Sione Taufa
 Lopeti Timani

Scrum-halves
 Luke Burgess
 Ben Meehan
 Junior Paila
 Nic Stirzaker (c)

Fly-halves
 Jack Debreczeni
 Shane Imo
 Martin Naufahu

| width="3%"| 
| width="30%" style="font-size: 95%;" valign="top"|

Centres
 Mitch Inman
 Lloyd Johansson
 Sefa Naivalu

Wingers
 Tom English
 Joe Kamana
 Telusa Veainu

Fullbacks
 Rennie Lautolo-Molimau
 Jonah Placid

Notes:(c) Team captainBold denotes internationally capped players at the time1 National player additional to contracted squad.
|}

{| class="collapsible collapsed" style=" width: 100%; margin: 0px; border: 1px solid darkgray; border-spacing: 3px;"
|-
! colspan="10" style="background:#f2f2f2; cell-border:2px solid black; padding-left:1em; padding-right:1em; text-align:center;"|2007 Melbourne Rebels squad – ARC
|-
| width="3%"| 
| width="30%" style="font-size: 95%;" valign="top"|

Props
 Scott Cameron
 Heamani Lavaka
 Dan Palmer
 Mike Ross

Hookers
 Nick Churven
 James Hanson
 Nick Hensley

Locks
 Matt Cockbain
 Liam Shaw
 Richard Stanford

| width="3%"| 
| width="30%" style="font-size: 95%;" valign="top"|

Loose Forwards
 David Croft (c)
 David Dennis
 Dave Haigh
 David Haydon
 Matt Hodgson
 Shawn Mackay
 Filipe Manu

Scrum-halves
 Luke Burgess
 Jon McGrath

Fly-halves
 Michael Hobbs
 Dan Kelly

| width="3%"| 
| width="30%" style="font-size: 95%;" valign="top"|

Centres  
 Luke Cross
 Jack Farrer
 James Lew

Wings
 Digby Ioane
 Peter Playford
 Peter Owens
 Nathan Trist

Fullbacks
 Damon Murphy

Notes:(c) Team captainBold denotes internationally capped players at the time
|}

Gallery

See also

 Rugby Victoria
 Melbourne Rebels

References

External links

National Rugby Championship
Rugby union teams in Victoria (Australia)
Sporting clubs in Melbourne
Rugby clubs established in 2007
2007 establishments in Australia
Rugby union clubs disestablished in 2020
2020 disestablishments in Australia